Souleymane Diop Cissokho (born 4 July 1991) is a Senegal-born French professional boxer. As an amateur he won a bronze medal at the 2016 Summer Olympics.

Professional boxing record

References

External links

 

1991 births
Living people
French male boxers
Olympic boxers of France
Boxers at the 2016 Summer Olympics
Medalists at the 2016 Summer Olympics
Olympic bronze medalists for France
Olympic medalists in boxing
European Games competitors for France
Boxers at the 2015 European Games
Welterweight boxers
Light-middleweight boxers
Sportspeople from Dakar